Jack Mitchell (born 7 April 1998 in Kent) is a British racing driver. He made his debut in the British Touring Car Championship for Team HARD in 2021.

Prior to the BTCC, Mitchell has raced in the Ginetta Junior Championship where he was the 2014 champion, Renault Clio Cup UK, Ginetta GT4 Supercup and the British GT Championship where he won the 2018 championship in the GT4 class.

Racing record

Complete British GT Championship results
(key) (Races in bold indicate pole position) (Races in italics indicate fastest lap)

Complete British Touring Car Championship results
(key) (Races in bold indicate pole position – 1 point awarded just in first race) (Races in italics indicate fastest lap – 1 point awarded all races) (* signifies that driver lead race for at least one lap – 1 point given all races)

References

External links

1998 births
Living people
British Touring Car Championship drivers
British GT Championship drivers
English racing drivers
British racing drivers
Renault UK Clio Cup drivers
Ginetta GT4 Supercup drivers
Ginetta Junior Championship drivers
Mini Challenge UK drivers
Toyota Gazoo Racing drivers
JHR Developments drivers
24H Series drivers